General elections were held in Liberia on 7 May 1963. In the presidential election, incumbent William Tubman of the True Whig Party was the only candidate, and was re-elected unopposed.

Results

References

Liberia
1963 in Liberia
Elections in Liberia
Single-candidate elections
Election and referendum articles with incomplete results